Artopoula  is a village in the Ioannina regional unit in Greece and the municipality of Dodoni.  In 2011 its population was 123.  It is situated at 500 m above sea level, in the hills near the upper course of the river Tyria. It is 6 km south of Koumaria, 6 km northwest of Lippa, 9 km southwest of Dodoni and 24 km southwest of Ioannina.

Population

See also

List of settlements in the Ioannina regional unit

External links
Artopoula at the GTP Travel Pages

References

Populated places in Ioannina (regional unit)